The men's marathon event was part of the track and field athletics programme at the 1924 Summer Olympics. The marathon was held on Sunday, July 13, 1924. It was only the second Olympic marathon to use the distance of 42.195 km (26 miles, 385 yards) which was first used in 1908 and is now the standard marathon distance. Fifty-eight runners from 20 nations competed, with no more than 6 runners per nation. The event was won by Albin Stenroos of Finland, the nation's second consecutive Olympic marathon victory.

Background

This was the seventh appearance of the event, which is one of 12 athletics events to have been held at every Summer Olympics. The Finnish team included defending champion Hannes Kolehmainen as well as Albin Stenroos, who had won two medals in other events in 1912; Ville Kyrönen had been the winner in the Finnish Olympic trials, however. 1920 silver medalist Jüri Lossmann of Estonia also returned. Boughera El Ouafi of France, who would win gold in 1928, competed for the first time. The American team had Clarence DeMar, the Boston Marathon winner in 1911, 1922, 1923, and 1924, Charles Mellor, who had run the Olympic marathon in 1920 and would win the Boston marathon in 1925, and Frank Zuna, the 1921 Boston winner. Great Britain had Dunky Wright. Shizo Kanakuri of Japan, still considered a missing person in Sweden after disappearing during the 1912 Olympic marathon, competed (as he had in 1920 as well).

Czechoslovakia, Ecuador, and Spain each made their first appearance in Olympic marathons. The United States made its seventh appearance, the only nation to have competed in each Olympic marathon to that point.

Records

Prior to this competition, the existing world and Olympic records were as follows:

Schedule

The race was delayed due to concerns about heat.

Results

The race was held on Sunday, July 13, 1924.

References

External links
Olympic Report
 

Men's marathon
Marathons at the Olympics
Men's marathons